Don't Knock the Ox is a Canadian short documentary film, directed by Tony Ianzelo and released in 1970. The film depicts the International Ox Pull competition in Bridgewater, Nova Scotia.

The film won the Canadian Film Award for Best Theatrical Short Film at the 23rd Canadian Film Awards in 1971.

References

External links
 Don't Knock the Ox at the National Film Board of Canada
 

1970s English-language films
Best Theatrical Short Film Genie and Canadian Screen Award winners
Canadian short documentary films
1970 short films
National Film Board of Canada short films
Films directed by Tony Ianzelo
Films shot in Nova Scotia
Quebec films
Films set in Nova Scotia
Films about cattle
English-language Canadian films
1970s Canadian films